Tangjeong Station is a railway station on Janghang Line of the Seoul Metropolitan Subway system. Work on the station began in October 2018 and it opened on October 30, 2021.

References

Seoul Metropolitan Subway stations
Metro stations in Asan
Railway stations opened in 2021